The Confederation of Cameroon Trade Unions (CCTU/CSTC) is a trade union centre in Cameroon.

It is affiliated with the International Trade Union Confederation, and the Organization of African Trade Union Unity.

References

Trade unions in Cameroon
International Trade Union Confederation
Organisation of African Trade Union Unity